Politics as Usual is the second album by the Massachusetts-based rapper Termanology. A music video for "How We Rock" was released in early 2009.

Track listing 

Sample credits
"Watch How It Go Down" - Contains a sample of "World Famous" by M.O.P.
"How We Rock" - Contains a sample of "Kitty With the Bent Frame" by Quincy Jones
"Float" - Contains a sample of "Float On' by The Floaters
"Please Don't Go" - Contains a sample of "I'm Without a Girl" by The Mighty Marvelows
"So Amazing" - Contains a sample of "You Made Me Believe" by Marilyn Scott
"Hood Shit" - Contains a sample of "Stand By" by Rick Wakeman

Chart history

References

Sources
 Politics as Usual [EXPLICIT LYRICS] on Amazon
 Mosi Reeves. "Reviews: Termanology: Politics as Usual", Spin, October 2008.
 Chris Faroaone. "Termanology | Politics As Usual", Boston Phoenix, October 1, 2008.
 Michele Centeno. "Termanology :: Politics As Usual", URB, October, 2008.
 Felicia J. Barclay. "Termanology: Politics As Usual (Album Review)", AllHipHop, October 3, 2008.
 Andrew Kameka. "Termanology - Politics As Usual", hiphopdx, October 3, 2008.
 Martin Caballero. "Termanology: Politics as Usual", okayplayer, October 13, 2008.
 Susan Kim. "Termanology :: Politics As Usual :: ST Records/Nature Sounds", rapreviews.com, November 4, 2008.

Termanology albums
2008 debut albums
Nature Sounds albums
Albums produced by DJ Premier
Albums produced by Pete Rock
Albums produced by Large Professor
Albums produced by Nottz
Albums produced by the Alchemist (musician)
Albums produced by Hi-Tek
Albums produced by Buckwild
Albums produced by Easy Mo Bee
Albums produced by Havoc (musician)